The Beginning Place is a short novel by American writer Ursula K. Le Guin, written in 1980. It was subsequently published under the title Threshold in 1986. The story's genre is a mixture of realism and fantasy literature. The novel's epigraph "What river is this through which the Ganges flows?" is quoted from Jorge Luis Borges. The novel has been subject to critical studies comparing it to C.S. Lewis' The Chronicles of Narnia, Lewis Carroll's Through the Looking-Glass and William Shakespeare's As You Like It.

Michael Moorcock has observed common elements between The Beginning Place and Robert Holdstock's award winning fantasy novel Mythago Wood; among other similarities, both novels involve alternate worlds and forest settings.

Plot summary 
The narrative focuses on the journey of the two main characters from adolescence to adulthood in two alternate worlds, the real world and the idyllic Tembreabrezi.

The story is told in alternating chapters from two starkly alternating viewpoints: that of Irene Pannis, and of Hugh Rogers. They live in the suburbs of an unnamed US city, in difficult circumstances and with troubled families. They independently discover a place hidden in a local wood, where time flows much more slowly than in the outside world and it is always evening, a "threshold" between their own world and another; though Hugh finds it first within the story, Irene has already been visiting the other world for some years. She has another life there in the town of Tembreabrezi, an adoptive family of sorts, and has learned the local language. Both Irene and Hugh love the "beginning place", the threshold; they feel a sense of belonging and home there that they lack elsewhere in their lives.

As Hugh stumbles upon the beginning place, Irene discovers that something is wrong in Tembreabrezi; the paths which connect the town with the rest of the country are closed somehow, and no one can reach or leave the town except for her. The closing is not material but emotional; the townsfolk are struck by a desperate fear which will not allow them to move beyond the town limits. Despite her anger with Hugh, and her resentment of his disturbance of her hidden sanctuary, they find that they must work together; she has had increasing trouble in passing through the gateway into the other place, while he cannot always cross back into the 'real' world. By travelling together they can pass back and forth through the gateway at will, and so they return to Tembreabrezi together. Hugh is welcomed in the town as the hero for whom they have waited; Irene is jealous, wanting desperately to win the admiration and respect of the townsfolk and especially the Mayor or Master, Sark, whom she has loved for a long time. Hugh is largely unaware of her feelings, but wants to complete the quest to become worthy of the Lord of the Manor's daughter Allia. In the end, they embark together on a mission to save the town and reopen the roads. Together they track down the monster that brings the fear and Hugh kills it. He is injured in the fight, but Irene helps him to keep going until they can reach the gateway back to their own world. On the other side, the trust and the love they have discovered together opens a different sort of gateway, providing them with a possible future together that avoids the destructive patterns of their own families.

Characters

Allia: Lord Horn's blonde daughter.
Donna: a checker at a grocery store where Hugh works. Donna is in her mid 40s and has red hair.
Hugh Rogers: a 20-year-old large, heavy bodied man. He is one of the two protagonists of the story.
Irene Pannis: a young, small framed woman. She is one of the two protagonists of the story.
Lord Horn: the leader of Mountain Town in Tembreabrezi. Lord Horn is a thin, old, graying man.
Mary Hanson: Irene's mother.
Master Dou Sark: a swarthy older man who functions as the Mayor of Mountain Town.
Palizot: a mother figure for Irene in Mountain Town.
Patsi Sobotny: a young lady who rents a room to Irene in the real world.
Rick: Patsi's live in boyfriend.
Sofir: Palizot's husband and a father figure for Irene in Mountain Town.
Victor Hansen: Irene's big, handsome, and abusive stepfather.

References

Sources
 

1980 American novels
Novels by Ursula K. Le Guin
American fantasy novels